Scarlets Mill is an unincorporated community in Robeson Township, Berks County, Pennsylvania, United States. The Twin Valley School District serves the village, whose zip code is 19508. Scarlets Mill is also located up Haycreek Road from the nearby village of Geigertown.

Scarlets Mill was named for John Scarlet.

References

Unincorporated communities in Berks County, Pennsylvania
Unincorporated communities in Pennsylvania